Douglas Maurice MacDowell,  (8 March 193117 January 2010) was a British classical scholar.

Early life and career
He was educated at Highgate School and Balliol College, Oxford where he gained first class honours in Greats. After National Service, and having taught at Allhallows School and then Merchant Taylors' School, he moved into academia. He was a lecturer at the University of Manchester before joining the University of Glasgow. He was Professor of Greek at Glasgow between 1971 and 2001, during which time he introduced courses on Ancient Greek civilisation which did not require knowledge of the language.

Honours
In 1991 MacDowell was elected a Fellow of the Royal Society of Edinburgh (FRSE), Scotland's national academy. In 1993 he was elected a Fellow of the British Academy (FBA), the United Kingdom's national academy for the humanities and social sciences.

Selected works

References

1931 births
2010 deaths
People educated at Highgate School
Alumni of Balliol College, Oxford
British classical scholars
Academics of the University of Manchester
Academics of the University of Glasgow
Fellows of the Royal Society of Edinburgh
Fellows of the British Academy